Ori Uzan is a former Israeli football player, and currently a football manager and broadcaster.

Early life
Uzan was born in Netanya, Israel, to a Sephardic Jewish (Tunisian-Jewish) family.

Career
He was born in Netanya, started playing in the youth department of Maccabi Netanya and played for several years in the club until he left to Maccabi Haifa at the end of the 2003–04 season.

In his first season, he captured a place in the opening squad but at the second year he was loaned to Hapoel Petah Tikva where he played at the second half of 2005–06 season.

In the summer of 2006 Uzen returned to Maccabi Netanya but left after one season since he had a few problems with his contract.  He then signed in Hapoel Kfar Saba for three seasons but played only one season after the team was relegated to Liga Leumit. In July 2008 he moved to Hapoel Petah Tikva for the second time in his career after he played in the team on loan in the 2005–06 season.

He retired in the end of the 2011–12 season after an injury in the spine.

Career statistics in the Israeli Premier League

Honours
Israeli Second Division:
Winner (1): 1998-99
Israeli Premier League:
Winner (1): 2004-05
Runner-up (1): 2006-07

References

External links
  Profile and biography of Ori Uzan on Maccabi Haifa's official website
  Profile and statistics of Ori Uzan on One.co.il

1978 births
Living people
Israeli Sephardi Jews
Israeli footballers
Maccabi Netanya F.C. players
Maccabi Haifa F.C. players
Hapoel Petah Tikva F.C. players
Hapoel Kfar Saba F.C. players
F.C. Ashdod players
Israel international footballers
Israeli Premier League players
Israeli people of Tunisian-Jewish descent
Footballers from Netanya
Association football defenders
Israeli Mizrahi Jews